Max McLaughlin (born February 29, 2000) is an American professional stock car racing driver who competes full-time in dirt racing, and part-time in the NASCAR Xfinity Series, driving the No. 96 Chevrolet Camaro for FRS Racing.

Racing career
On February 2, 2018, it was announced that McLaughlin would be driving part-time for Niece Motorsports in the No. 38 truck. He finished 12th in his first start at Eldora, which ended up being his only start with the team.

In 2019, McLaughlin joined Hattori Racing Enterprises for his first full asphalt racing season in the NASCAR K&N Pro Series East, driving the No. 1 Toyota Camry. McLaughlin won his first career race at Watkins Glen International. In October 2020, McLaughlin won in a Big Block dirt modified Super DIRTcar Series race at Weedsport Speedway.

For 2021, McLaughlin decided to put more focus on his dirt racing efforts and would therefore not run another full season in the East Series.

Personal life
He is the son of former NASCAR driver Mike McLaughlin.

Motorsports career results

NASCAR
(key) (Bold – Pole position awarded by qualifying time. Italics – Pole position earned by points standings or practice time. * – Most laps led. ** – All laps led.)

Xfinity Series

Camping World Truck Series

ARCA Menards Series
(key) (Bold – Pole position awarded by qualifying time. Italics – Pole position earned by points standings or practice time. * – Most laps led.)

ARCA Menards Series East

 Season still in progress

Whelen Modified Tour

References

External links
 

Living people
NASCAR drivers
2000 births
People from Mooresville, North Carolina